Fred Hamilton may refer to:

 Fred Hamilton (Coronation Street), a character on Coronation Street
 Fred Hamilton (bridge), American bridge player

See also
 Frederick Hamilton (disambiguation)